James LeRoy Bakken (born November 2, 1940) is an American former professional football player who was a punter and placekicker for the National Football League’s St. Louis Cardinals. He was a four-time Pro Bowl selection and was named to the NFL’s All-Decade Team for both the 1960s and 1970s; Bakken is one of 29 individuals to be named to two All-Decade teams.

Early career 
Before his NFL career, Bakken played football at Madison West High School in Madison, Wisconsin. He went on to play three seasons at the University of Wisconsin, where he played on the 1960 Rose Bowl team as a sophomore and led the Big Ten in punting average in 1960 and 1961. He was named to the Madison (Wisconsin) Sports Hall of Fame in 1984, and was later inducted into the UW Athletic Department-National W Club Hall of Fame.

NFL career 
Bakken was drafted by the Los Angeles Rams in the 7th round in 1962. He did not make the team and was instead picked up by the St. Louis Cardinals, where he would play his entire NFL career. He played 17 seasons, scoring a total of 1,380 points while never missing a game between 1963 and 1978. He cracked the 100-point threshold in a season three times (1964, 1967, and 1973) and was selected to kick in the Pro Bowl four times. For a time, he was president of the NFL Players Association. 

In 1967, Bakken set the record for most field goals in a game with seven (out of nine attempts, also a record).  The single-game record for field goals was later tied by Rich Karlis in 1989, Chris Boniol in 1996, and Billy Cundiff in 2003 before Rob Bironas broke it with eight in a game in 2007.

Honors 
Bakken was named by the voters of the Pro Football Hall of Fame to the Professional Football 1960s All Decade Team, which included both NFL and American Football League players.  The voters of the Pro Football Hall of Fame also selected Bakken to the NFL 1970s All-Decade Team.

In December 2010, the annual trophy for the Big Ten's best kicker, the "Bakken-Andersen Kicker of the Year" award, was co-named in his honor.

Career regular season statistics
Career high/best bolded

See also
List of most consecutive starts and games played by National Football League players

References

External links
 Univ. of Wisconsin–Madison Hall of Fame biography

Living people
1940 births
Sportspeople from Madison, Wisconsin
American football placekickers
American football punters
Wisconsin Badgers football players
St. Louis Cardinals (football) players
Eastern Conference Pro Bowl players
National Conference Pro Bowl players
Players of American football from Wisconsin
Madison West High School alumni